Subway, Subways, The Subway, or The Subways may refer to:

Transportation 
 Subway, a term for underground rapid transit rail systems
 Subway (underpass), a type of walkway that passes underneath an obstacle
 Subway (George Bush Intercontinental Airport), a people mover in Houston, Texas, United States

Entertainment

Film
 Subway (film), a 1985 French thriller film

Television
 "Subway" (Homicide: Life on the Street), a television episode
 "The Subway" (Seinfeld), a television episode

Music
 Subway (group), an American band
 The Subways, an English rock band
The Subways (album), their self-titled debut album
 "Subways" (song), by the Avalanches
 "Subway", a song by the Bee Gees on their album Children of the World

Other uses
 Subway (restaurant), an American fast-food chain that primarily sells submarine sandwiches
 The Subway (Zion National Park), a slot canyon in Utah, United States

See also